John Flaherty is a baseball commentator.

John Flaherty may also refer to:

John Flaherty (cricketer)
John P. Flaherty Jr., Supreme Court of Pennsylvania judge
Jack Flaherty (gymnast)

See also
Jack Flaherty (disambiguation)
John O'Flaherty (disambiguation)